The 2013 USAFL National Championships was the 17th installment of the premier United States annual Australian rules football club tournament. The tournament was held in Austin, Texas from 19 to 20 October. The National Champions from the men's competition were the Austin Crows and from the women's competition the champions were the Denver Bulldogs.

Men's Division One tournament

Minor rounds

Final Division Ladders

Division 1

Grand final

Men's Division Two tournament

Men's Division Three tournament

Men's Division Four tournament

Men's National Club Rankings

See also

References

External links

AFL season
Australian rules football competitions
National championships in the United States
Sports competitions in Texas
Sports in Austin, Texas
2013 in sports in Texas